Loose lips sink ships is an American World War II propaganda slogan which became an English idiom.

Loose Lips Sink Ships may also refer to:

"Loose Lips Sink Ships", a song by Camper van Beethoven from the album Camper Van Beethoven Is Dead. Long Live Camper Van Beethoven
"Loose Lips Sink Ships", a song by A Change of Pace from the album An Offer You Can't Refuse 
"Loose Lips Sink Ships", a song by Hit the Lights from the album Until We Get Caught
Loose Lips Sink Ships, a musical play produced by the American Folklore Theatre
"Loose Lips Sink Ships", an episode of the American television program Survivor: Heroes vs. Villains

See also
Loose Lips (disambiguation)